More Kittens is a Silly Symphonies animated Disney short film. It was released in 1936 and is the sequel to Three Orphan Kittens.

Plot
The housekeeper sends the Three Orphan Kittens straight outside into the garden for causing trouble. They come across a St. Bernard, Bolivar and they get friendly with him while he tries to relax in peace. Later the kittens continue to explore the garden, running into a tortoise and the black kitten being pestered by a bluebird, causing the washing clothesline to loosen and leading to the kittens knocking over the wash tub and spreading water all over the garden front. The housekeeper angrily chases the kittens who take cover under Bolivar. She briefly comments about Bolivar's laziness and moves on, then the kittens emerge and lovingly nuzzle Bolivar.

Reception
Motion Picture Herald (Jan 9, 1937): "The antics of three playful kittens imbued with infectious gaiety serve to number this as one of the best of Walt Disney's animated Silly Symphonies. In the characteristic feline manner, scaled down to fit their size, the three kittens cavort from prank to prank, much to the conservation [sic] of a Negro servant. An indigent member of the canine family, though much abused by the kittens, in the time of stress becomes their benefactor."

Boxoffice (Jan 30, 1937): "Continuing the amazing adventures of the three little kittens who were introduced to picture fans in an earlier Silly Symphony, the cartoon is again quaintly laughable throughout although lacking somewhat in the originality and sparkle of the other recent Disney subjects... Worthy of a spot on any bill."

Voice cast
 Maid: Lillian Randolph
 Meows: Elvia Allman
 Birds: Clarence Nash

Home media
The short was released on December 19, 2006 on Walt Disney Treasures: More Silly Symphonies, Volume Two.

References

External links

1936 films
1936 short films
1936 animated films
American sequel films
1930s Disney animated short films
Films directed by David Hand
Films directed by Wilfred Jackson
Films produced by Walt Disney
Silly Symphonies
Animated films about cats
Animated films without speech
Films scored by Frank Churchill
American animated short films
1930s American films